Johann Christian Jacobi may refer to:

John Christian Jacobi (1670-1750), German born hymn translator; Keeper of the Royal German Chapel in St James Palace
Johann Christian Jacobi (oboist) (1719-1784), oboist and composer in Germany